David Marrero and Dawid Olejniczak were the defending champions, but they didn't start this year.
Polish pair Tomasz Bednarek and Mateusz Kowalczyk won this tournament, by defeating Oleksandr Dolgopolov Jr. and Artem Smirnov 6–3, 6–4 in the final.

Seeds

Draw

Draw

References
 Doubles Draw

Pekao Open - Doubles
2009 Doubles
2009 in Polish tennis